The 1966 Navy Midshipmen football team represented the United States Naval Academy (USNA) as an independent during the 1966 NCAA University Division football season. The team was led by second-year head coach Bill Elias.

Schedule

Roster

References

Navy
Navy Midshipmen football seasons
Navy Midshipmen football